Mihailo Petrović (1868–1943), Serbian mathematician and inventor.
 Mihailo Petrović (Chetnik) (1871–1941), Serbian freedom fighter
 Mihailo Petrović (footballer) (born 1957), Serbian footballer and coach

See also
 Michael, Prince of Montenegro (Mihailo Petrović-Njegoš, 1908–1986)
 Mihajlo Petrović (pilot), Serbian aviator (1884–1913)